is a style of traditional Japanese music.

In the Edo period,  were performed, composed and instructed by the Tōdōza, a guild of blind men; due to this,  is also called .

In the present day,  has spread across Japan, and in its course has been integrated into  (music for the ), and has strong ties with both  and  traditions.

Overview 
As a form of  music,  was established in Kamigata region in its early stage, then it was performed in Edo around Genroku era. Later,  would change its form as musical accompaniment of kabuki in Edo; this new form was called . Until the end of Edo period,  had spread around not only Kamigata but also, to the east, Nagoya, and to the west, Chūgoku region, and Kyusyu region. After the Meiji period,  was once again promoted toward Tokyo (formerly Edo), then spread out rapidly.

Today  is popular in traditional music field across Japan, except in Okinawa. Having said that,  also has character as a part of traditional vocal music and developed along with it.

History

Early years in Edo period

The  (Chinese lute) arrived in Japan at Sakai, Osaka via Ryukyu near the end of the Sengoku period.

Ishimura-Kengyo is particularly regarded as originator of  music. After that, musicians, mainly at Tōdōza, performed, composed and handed down . The existing oldest piece is considered as a work of the early years of Edo period.

Mid-Edo period

Emergence of  
Around the Genroku era, which feature a consistent story, appeared. , a blind official often engaged in music, apparently started to compose  in Edo. The famous composers are Asari-kengyo and Sayama-Kengyo, and it seems that before long composers in Kamigata also took this style for their work. In the course of time,  came to be used as musical accompaniment of kabuki.

Emergence of  
Another tide around this era, instrumental aspect was focused intensively as well as vocal composition, so that pieces took an instrumental part without vocal, typically it was located in the middle part of a song. This musical interlude, instrumental part between singing is called , and this style is called .

Miscellaneous pieces which are not categorized as above were also composed. These kind of pieces are called .

The center of that boom was Osaka.

and  ensembles 

The  was often used together with other instruments, before finally all three instruments – ,  and  – were used together, creating the  ensemble.

At the end of the 18th century,  composed many  pieces which feature lyrics and stories taken from Noh. This was called .

Emergence of  
Around same time, a genre called  emerged. This genre has comical contents. For example, animals such as rats, snails and raccoon doga are protagonists and make efforts to escape from difficult situations. Narrativity dominates this genre and sound effects are used.

Later years in the Edo period

Maturity of  
From the middle to the end of Edo period, pieces which had high musical achievement were composed. Key developments were long interludes and instrumental parts between blocks of vocal parts called .

Minesaki-koutou, active in the end of 18th century in Osaka, achieved success in the  field. He defined  as long and technical instrumental parts within a piece and composed great number of pieces which focused on the 's technical playing. His follower, Mitsuhashi-koutou, increased the  part within a piece, resulting in  becoming longer and more varied than ever. As a result,  came to have and emphasized instrumental part in the course of its development.

Beginning of polyphonic composition and development of ensemble 
Most previous compositions had been almost in unison in  ensembles; in contrast, Ichiura began composing polyphonic ensembles.

Major development of  
Later, the majority of  composition moved to Kyoto. Kikuoka-kengyo (1792–1847 composed  and contributed its development in Kyoto. Yaezaki-kengyo (1776–1848), who was also active in same era, composed the  part of most pieces and arranged Kikuoka's compositions.

Improvement of  plectrum 
Around this era, Tsuyama-kengyo from Osaka invented an improved plectrum used in  playing.

Emergence of independent  
Mitsusaki-kengyo, a junior fellow musician of Kikuoka-kengyo, was active then. He was also a pupil of Yaezaki-kengyo. He composed some pieces featuring a solo , and this became a trigger to develop  independently. Yoshizawa-kengyo took over and promoted this movement, then began to develop it gradually.

Integrated parts 
Thus the instrumental parts were integrated and refined. His junior followers also took over this method.

In the last years of the Edo period,  became popular across Japan and was influenced and integrated into local styles of music.

After the Meiji period

Disorder after the Meiji Restoration and popularization of  
In the Meiji period,  developed independently, and composition of  declined.  composition did not disappear entirely, and some composers continued to create their own works; however, tunes composed only for the  increased overwhelmingly. , having already reached its perfection, saw little further room for improvement or innovation, whereas the  could easily deal with the tonal scale elements from Western music and Chinese music.

As the new government dissolved , musicians there lost their status, which had previous been protected by the privilege system, and musical activity changed accordingly.  who lost their authority faced hardship, and had to earn their living by appearing in popular theater. Meanwhile,  music had a chance once again to be well known by the general publkc, specifically in the eastern part of Japan such as Tokyo, where  was not so much performed. Many musicians from the western part of Japan, such as the Kyusyu region and Osaka, found their way to Tokyo.

Meanwhile, new compositions of  reduced. One notable composer was Michio Miyagi.

Up to today, composers habe tried to introduce various forms (such as Western sonatas) to the  style.

Musical features 

After the middle of the Edo period,  – ,  and  – started to contain common pieces to play in ensemble, then integrated themselves gradually, before finally consolidating with each other.

However, originally  was created for  music, and early -oriented music such as  accordingly is not  in origin.

Introspective pieces 
Most pieces for  have been composed by blind musicians; thus,  is regarded as an expression of emotion, and not of visual impression.

Polyphonic and diverse ensemble playing 
 has the strongest aspects of instrumental ensemble among modern Japanese traditional music, as most of the pieces are played in ensemble.

Strong instrumental features 
This is because , the instrumental part, takes precedence over the vocal part.

Few pieces are purely instrumental; most include a vocal part. Most pieces in this style are considered to be highly artistic as pure instrumental music, not as a simple description of nature and emotion.

technique

Wide range of octaves 

Techniques that require fine skill 
In contrast, the use of percussive techniques, which create dramatic effects when playing for performing arts, is rare.

Frequent modulation and tuning change 
Most pieces have modulation at least once even if the piece is short, and pieces more than medium duration have frequent modulation. Common modulations are dominant key and sub-dominant key, though this is not always the case.

Most pieces more than medium duration have tuning change in middle of the piece at least once. Long pieces change tuning almost twice, and changing tuning three times is not uncommon. The purpose of tuning change is for modulation and to change the mood of the sound.

Vocal technique

Articulation 
Singing usually uses the stretching of each one note, and its long vowel tone accompanies certain articulation.  especially features skill of articulation; some  pieces also focus on the articulation of singing. Vocal melody is based on the intonation of dialect of the Kansai region, where  was born in.

Vocal melody employing a wide range of octaves 
Vocal melodies in  usually utilise about 2 octaves. The character of a piece decides whether to use high tones more often than low tones, depending on the intent of the song – for example, a song for a woman, or a requiem.

Narration 
Pieces which contain a narrative vocal part are very rare.

Less dramatic expression 
 has developed without a relation to the performing arts, and thus dramatic expression is less used.

Classification of pieces 
Great number of pieces and long history make Jiuta have many sub-styles. Thus classification is done by  not only musical style, but also variety of viewpoint, accordingly a piece can belong to different class.
Below are some examples.

 Class for musical style
 Nagauta （'長歌' songs with solid story, long pieces are common）
 Hauta （'端歌' miscellaneous pieces, relatively short and lyrical pieces）
 Tegotomono （'手事物' pieces with Tegoto part）
 Instrumental piece （without vocal part）
 Class for musical content and feeling
 Sakumono （'作もの' pieces with comical stories, often employs Tegoto）
 Shishimono （'獅子もの' pieces which has postfix 'shishi', which means lion, to its title, features solemn and splendour feeling. All the pieces of this type belong to Tegotomono）
 Class for location
 Osakamono （'大阪もの' Tegotomono composed in Osaka）
 Kyomono （'京もの' Tegotomono composed in Kyoto）
 Nagoyamono （'名古屋もの' pieces composed by Yoshizawa-kengyo and his followers）
 Kyusyumono （'九州もの' pieces composed in Kyusyu）

See also 
 Sankyoku
 Shakuhachi
 Kokyū

References

Japanese traditional music
Japanese words and phrases